The Jones House is a historic house at 220 Bush Street in Sulphur Springs, Benton County, Arkansas.  It is a -story wood-frame structure with a T shape and cross-gable roof.  The front facade, one of the ends of the crosspiece of the T, has beveled corners with the roof overhanging above the second floor, an Eastlake element.  A porch wraps around the stem of the T, which extends to the south.  It is supported by turned columns and features a spindled frieze.  Built c. 1896, it is a fine and well-preserved example of Eastlake-style architecture.

The house was listed on the National Register of Historic Places in 1988.

See also
National Register of Historic Places listings in Benton County, Arkansas

References

Houses on the National Register of Historic Places in Arkansas
Victorian architecture in Arkansas
Houses completed in 1896
Houses in Benton County, Arkansas
National Register of Historic Places in Benton County, Arkansas
1896 establishments in Arkansas
Stick-Eastlake architecture in the United States